WNBT-FM (104.5 MHz) and WZBF (96.9 MHz), "Bigfoot Country 96 - 104 - 107") are two radio stations broadcasting a country music radio format.   WNBT-FM is licensed to Wellsboro, Pennsylvania, and WZBF is licensed to Ridgebury, Pennsylvania.  The stations are part of a quadcast serving Pennsylvania's Northern Tier and New York's Southern Tier, including the Elmira - Corning radio market.  They are owned by Kristin Cantrell (doing business as Seven Mountains Media), through licensee Southern Belle, LLC.

History

WNBT-FM began as the FM sister station of Farm & Home Broadcasting Company-owned WNBT (now WNDA) with the call letters WGCR-FM.  The station was initially granted a construction permit to operate at the frequency of 97.7 Mhz at an effective radiated power of a thousand watts in August 1968.  In 1973, the FCC granted permission for WGCR-FM to drop the 'FM' from its call letters, change its city of license from Wellsboro to "Wellsboro-Mansfield", and change its dial position from 97.7 to 104.5 mHz, with a power increase to 50,000 watts.

In May 2017, WNBT-FM changed their format from hot adult contemporary (branded as "The Buzz") to country, branded as "Bigfoot Country 104.5".

On July 9, 2018, WNBT-FM began simulcasting on WZBF 96.9 FM Ridgebury (formerly adult contemporary-formatted WVYS "Yes FM").

Translator and booster

References

External links

NBT-FM
Country radio stations in the United States
Tioga County, Pennsylvania